Corvey Irvin (born May 3, 1985) is a former American football defensive tackle. He was drafted by the Carolina Panthers in the third round of the 2009 NFL Draft. He played college football at Georgia.

Irvin has been a member of the Carolina Panthers, Jacksonville Jaguars, Tampa Bay Buccaneers, Chicago Bears, Dallas Cowboys, Detroit Lions, Calgary Stampeders, Montreal Alouettes, Saskatchewan Roughriders, and Winnipeg Blue Bombers.

Professional career

Tampa Bay Buccaneers
Irvin was claimed off waivers by the Tampa Bay Buccaneers on September 1, 2012.

Chicago Bears
He worked out at Chicago Bears minicamp in 2013, and was signed on May 13. On August 31, 2013, Irvin was released.

Dallas Cowboys
On November 12, 2013, Irvin signed a contract with the Dallas Cowboys

Detroit Lions
On March 4, 2014, Irvin signed with the Detroit Lions.

Calgary Stampeders
Irvin was signed to the Calgary Stampeders (CFL) practice roster on August 20, 2014. He was released by the Stampeders on September 10, 2014.

Montreal Alouettes
Irvin was signed to the Montreal Alouettes (CFL) practice roster on October 10, 2014. He was promoted to the active roster on November 7, 2014. In his one season with the Als Irvin played in 13 games and racked up 11 tackles and 3 sacks.

Saskatchewan Roughriders
Irvin was signed by the Saskatchewan Roughriders (CFL) on February 12, 2016. Irvin played in all 18 regular season games for the Riders, contributing 27 tackles and 5 sacks. Following the 2016 season he was not re-signed by the Riders and became a free agent on February 14, 2017.

Winnipeg Blue Bombers 
On March 13, 2017 Irvin signed with the Winnipeg Blue Bombers (CFL). He retired before the start of the 2017 season on April 21, 2017.

References

External links
 Georgia Bulldogs bio
 Montreal Alouettes bio

1985 births
Living people
Players of American football from Augusta, Georgia
American football defensive tackles
Georgia Bulldogs football players
Carolina Panthers players
Detroit Lions players
Jacksonville Jaguars players
Tampa Bay Buccaneers players
Chicago Bears players
Dallas Cowboys players
Montreal Alouettes players
Winnipeg Blue Bombers players
American Wing Chun practitioners